SW20 may refer to 

 The chassis code for the second generation of Toyota MR2, equipped with S engines
 SW20, a postcode district in the SW postcode area